The V. R. Means House on E. 14th Street in Belton, Texas was built in 1913.  It was listed on the National Register of Historic Places in 1990.

It was built by the New Lumber Co. for one of its officers, V.R. Means, and seems to have been intended as a model house for the firm's work.  The firm eventually built more than 100 homes in the area.

See also

National Register of Historic Places listings in Bell County, Texas

References

Houses on the National Register of Historic Places in Texas
Colonial Revival architecture in Texas
Houses completed in 1913
Houses in Bell County, Texas
1913 establishments in Texas
National Register of Historic Places in Bell County, Texas